David Telfer (born 1 December 1988 in Obuasi) is a Ghanaian footballer, who currently plays for Ashanti Gold SC.

Career 
Telfer began his career in the AshantiGold Soccer Academy and was promoted to Ashanti Gold SC of the Ghana Premier League in January 2006.

In August 2008 from Ashanti Gold SC out to Free State Stars, he joined with teammate Jonathan Mensah.

Telfer returned to Ghana and registered for Ashanti Gold SC for the 2009–2010 season. He is an integral member of the team and produced several sterling performances. In September 2010, he signed with the Moldovan side CSCA-Rapid Chişinău and played four matches during the 2010/2011 season in the Divizia Naţională. In August 2011 returned to Ashanti Gold SC.

International career 
Telfer played for the Meteors and 2007 for the Black Stars, formerly as 2005 was called for the Black Starlets. He earned his debut on 14 August 2009 against Zambia national football team for the Ghana national football team, he came on as a 2nd half substitute in the game.

References 

1988 births
Living people
Ghanaian footballers
Ghana international footballers
Association football midfielders
Expatriate soccer players in South Africa
Ashanti Gold SC players
People from Obuasi
Ghanaian expatriates in South Africa
Free State Stars F.C. players